El Khiam (الخیام) is an archaeological site near Wadi Khureitun in the Judaean Desert in the West Bank, on the shores of the Dead Sea.

Archaeological finds at El Khiam show nearly continuous habitation by groups of hunters since the Mesolithic and early Neolithic periods. 

The Khiamian period (c. 10000–9500 BCE), named for this site, is characterized by flint arrowheads now known as "El-Khiam points".

El Khiam was first excavated by 

Gallery

References

Further reading
The birth of the Gods and the origins of agriculture

1934 archaeological discoveries
Archaeological sites in the West Bank
Khiamian sites
Neolithic sites of Asia
Mesolithic sites of Asia
Judaean Desert
Populated places established in the 10th millennium BC